SANFL Women's League (also known as the SANFLW or the Hostplus SANFL Women's League) is the major state-level women's Australian rules football league in South Australia.

History
The league was launched in February 2017, initially comprising four clubs from the men's South Australian National Football League (SANFL). The league now features eight teams, and acts as the second primary competition for South Australian female footballers underneath the semi-professional national AFL Women's (AFLW) competition, as well as being one of the three elite leagues in women's Australian rules football (the AFLW, SANFLW and WAFLW).

The SANFLW usually runs from February to May, meaning it partially overlapped with the AFLW season prior to AFLW Season 7, and so has been mostly played by players either not yet drafted by an AFLW club or AFLW listed players not selected for a senior premiership match.

In 2022, the SANFL Commission introduced the SANFL Women's Development League, a seven-week reserves competition providing players from the eight clubs with the opportunity to play at a level beneath the senior competition.

Clubs
The first season comprised four SANFL clubs: Norwood, Glenelg, North Adelaide and West Adelaide. The following year, Sturt and South Adelaide were admitted to the competition, with Woodville-West Torrens and Central District being admitted in 2019.

Neither of the state's two AFL clubs, Adelaide and Port Adelaide, who field reserves teams in the SANFL, field teams in the SANFLW; Adelaide were a foundation club of the AFLW in 2017, while Port Adelaide entered the league in 2022.

Honours

Premiers
This lists the most recent premiers. For a full list of premiers see List of SANFL Women's League premiers.
 2022:

Best and Fairest Award
This lists the most recent best and fairest winner. For a full list of winners see SANFL Women's League Best and Fairest Award.
 2022: Jessica Bates

See also
 AFL Women's
 VFL Women's
 South Australian National Football League

References

External links
 

 
 
Women's Australian rules football leagues in Australia
Australian rules football competitions in South Australia
2017 establishments in Australia
Sports leagues established in 2017